The UCI ProSeries is the second tier men's elite road cycling tour. It was inaugurated in 2020. The series is placed below the UCI World Tour, but above the various regional UCI Continental Circuits.

Development
In December 2018, the UCI announced various reforms to the structure and organisation of men's professional road racing. One of the major changes is the introduction of a new division of races called the UCI ProSeries. With the introduction of the ProSeries, the UCI .HC road races will disappear from the calendar. In October 2019, the UCI published the 2020 UCI International Road Calendar, including the ProSeries. The inaugural season of the ProSeries was planned to include 57 events, which were formerly World Tour, .HC or .1 events, but many were cancelled due to the worldwide COVID-19 pandemic of 2020–21.

Team participation
In events of the ProSeries, UCI WorldTeams may participate, up to a maximum of 70% in European races and 65% in other races. The rest of the teams participating may be UCI ProTeams, UCI Continental teams, or National teams.

Events
The inaugural UCI ProSeries calendar consisted of 57 events, of which 30 were one-day races (1.Pro) and 27 were stage races (2.Pro). Due to the COVID-19 pandemic, multiple events were cancelled, postponed or introduced in both 2020 and 2021 and the ProSeries calendar has been revised several times.

Winners by race

Most race wins

Race wins by country

Race wins by team 
Teams in italics are no longer active.

References 

 
Men's road cycling
ProSeries
Recurring sporting events established in 2020